Penstemon tenuis is a species of flowering plant in the plantain family known by the common name sharpsepal beardtongue. It is endemic to Texas, Louisiana, Mississippi, and Arkansas in the United States where it is found in open, damp areas in alluvial soil. It flowers from early April into early June.

Description

The leaves have pointed tips and toothed or entire margins. Lower leaves are sessile and upper leaves are connate. The bell-shaped flowers grow in terminal racemes. The pink or lightly purple flowers have white throats. The upper lip of the flower has two erect lobes and the lower lip has three rounded lips.

References

tenuis
Flora of Arkansas
Plants described in 1903